The Reina Nacional de Belleza Miss República Dominicana 2010 was hand-picked by the Organization of Miss Dominican Republic and the franchiser responsible to send a Dominican representative to the Miss International 2010 beauty pageant. The Reina Nacional de Belleza Miss República Dominicana 2010 pageant was postponed due to lack of money and sponsors. Instead they hand-picked Sofinel Baez, a professional model who was born in Santo Domingo and raised in the Distrito Nacional. The Official representative had her official press presentation on June 12, 2010, in the Jet Set Café in the city of Santo Domingo in the Dominican Republic.

Results

References

External links
 Nueva Reina Nacional de Belleza Miss República Dominicana 2010
 Miss RD US

Miss Dominican Republic
2010 beauty pageants
2010 in the Dominican Republic